The Rider's Halting Place is a painting by the Dutch artist Philips Wouwerman. It was painted in the 17th century, and is now in the Royal Museum of Fine Arts in Antwerp, Belgium.

References

Landscape paintings
17th-century paintings
Dutch paintings
Paintings in the collection of the Royal Museum of Fine Arts Antwerp
Paintings by Philips Wouwerman
Horses in art